ID Medical is a UK based healthcare recruiter, founded in 2002. The company supplies locum doctors, nurses, allied health professionals and clerical staff to more than 90% of NHS hospitals and private organisations. It is headquartered in Milton Keynes, and has an office in London, UK.

ID Medical was named on the 2015 and 2017 lists of ‘1000 Companies to Inspire Britain’ by London Stock Exchange, which aims to recognise some of the fastest-growing and most dynamic businesses in the UK. The company was listed in #21 place in the Real Business Hot 100 Companies in 2014. ID Medical was ranked #99 in UK's fastest growing private companies in the Sunday Times Fast Track 100. From 2013 to 2016, and in 2019, it was featured in The Sunday Times 100 Best Companies to Work For in the United Kingdom.

History 
ID Medical Group was founded in 2002. The company is owned by Dr. Mo Sacoor, Mike Sacoor, and Deenu Patel. In 2015, ID Medical saw sales grow 51% to £186.9 million.

In 2014, the company launched ID Medical School, a CPD accredited education and medical training facility in collaboration with The Royal Society of Medicine. It launched a turnaround service for care homes and hospitals in May 2019.

References

External links 
 
 Profit Track 100: Profiles 51-100 at The Times

Companies established in 2002
Companies based in Milton Keynes
Health care companies of the United Kingdom